This is a list of words of Zulu origin attested in use by speakers of South African English.

 abatagati (from abathakathi, a word also used in Xhosa; cf. synonymous umtagati, a borrowing into South African English from other Nguni languages) witches, warlocks, or other practitioners of magic for evil purposes
 aikona (from hhayi khona "not here") no; certainly not; not at all
 baba (from baba "father," a respectful form of address toward an older man) sir, mister
 Fanagalo (from the phrase fana ga lo "like this") a Zulu-based pidgin spoken primarily by South African miners
 madumbi (from amadumbe "taro tubers") taro tuber
 umfundisi a teacher, priest, or missionary

See also
 South African English
 List of South African slang words

References

Zulu
South Africa-related lists
South African English
Zulu language